Jorge Enrique Pedre (born October 12, 1966 in Culver City, California) is a former Major League Baseball catcher who played for two seasons. He played for the Kansas City Royals for ten games during the 1991 Kansas City Royals season and four games during the 1992 Chicago Cubs season. He now works at a refinery on the emergency response team.

External links

1966 births
Living people
Appleton Foxes players
Baseball City Royals players
Baseball players from California
Chicago Cubs players
Eugene Emeralds players
Iowa Cubs players
Kansas City Royals players
Los Angeles Harbor Seahawks baseball players
Major League Baseball catchers
Memphis Chicks players
New Britain Red Sox players
Omaha Royals players
Pawtucket Red Sox players
People from Culver City, California
West Los Angeles College alumni
West Los Angeles Wildcats baseball players